On 12 May 2022, at least 1 person was killed and 13 were left injured in a blast near the Saddar area of Karachi, Sindh, Pakistan.

According to reports, the bomb was placed inside a motorcycle close to a garbage dump.

The Baloch Liberation army (BLA) claimed responsibility for the attack, stating that it was carried out in retaliation for the government's crackdown on the group's activities.

Reactions  
The bombing in the Saddar neighbourhood was claimed by a little-known terrorist group called the Sindhudesh Revolutionary Army (SRA).

Chief Minister Punjab Hamza Shahbaz released a statement condemning the bombing.

Response
A prime facilitator of the attack, Allah Dino, along with another terrorist of SRA were killed in Counter Terrorism Department (CTD) raid in Keamari area on 18 May.

On 22 May, CTD arrested Manzoor Hussain, an accomplice of Allah Dino, from Hyderabad’s Subhan Colony. Hussain was involved in damaging railway tracks and had also unsuccessfully tried to conduct an IED blast on 23 March.

References

Saddar bombing
Saddar bombing
May 2022 events in Pakistan
Explosions in 2022
Terrorist incidents in Pakistan in 2022
Saddar bombing
Saddar Town